Aegocera bimacula is a moth of the family Noctuidae first described by Francis Walker in 1854. It is found in India and Sri Lanka.

Larval host plants include Leea guineensis, Dillenia pentagyna and Vitis species.

References

Moths of Asia
Moths described in 1854
Agaristinae